The Winding Trail, also known by its working title of The Tiger Cat is a 1918 American silent Western film directed by John H. Collins and starring Viola Dana, Clifford Bruce, and Hayward Mack. It was released on January 14, 1918.

Cast list
 Viola Dana as Audrey Graham
 Clifford Bruce as Zachary Wando
 Hayward Mack as Alvin Steele
 Mabel Van Buren as Lou

References

External links 
 
 
 

1918 films
1918 Western (genre) films
1918 lost films
American black-and-white films
Films directed by John H. Collins
Films produced by B. A. Rolfe
Lost Western (genre) films
Metro Pictures films
Silent American Western (genre) films
1910s American films
1910s English-language films